New Castle Leather Raw Stock Warehouse, also known as the Kaumagraph Building, is a historic warehouse building located at Wilmington, New Castle County, Delaware. It was built in 1917, and is a three-story, rectangular steel, concrete, and brick building measuring 100 feet by 200 feet and featuring a projecting roof cornice, flat roof, and large window areas.  It is characterized as a fireproof industrial building in the commercial style of the early 1900s. It was originally built as a warehouse to store goatskins for a Wilmington kid leather manufacturer and later housed the plant and offices of a specialty printing firm.

It was added to the National Register of Historic Places in 1983.  It is located in the East Brandywine Historic District.

See also 
 Main Office of the New Castle Leather Company

References

Industrial buildings and structures on the National Register of Historic Places in Delaware
Industrial buildings completed in 1917
Buildings and structures in Wilmington, Delaware
Warehouses on the National Register of Historic Places
Leather industry
National Register of Historic Places in Wilmington, Delaware
Individually listed contributing properties to historic districts on the National Register in Delaware